The 150th Ohio Infantry Regiment, sometimes 150th Ohio Volunteer Infantry (or 150th OVI) was an infantry regiment in the Union Army during the American Civil War.

Service
The 150th Ohio Infantry was organized at Camp Taylor near Cleveland, Ohio, and mustered in May 5, 1864, for 100 days service under the command of Colonel William H. Hayward.

The regiment left Ohio for Washington, D.C., May 7, and was assigned to garrison duty at Fort Lincoln, Fort Saratoga, Fort Thayer, Fort Bunker Hill, Fort Slocum, Fort Totten, and Fort Stevens, Defenses of Washington, until August.  It was attached to 1st Brigade, Haskins' Division, XXII Corps, to July. 2nd Brigade, Haskins' Division, XXII Corps, to August. Engaged in the repulse of Early's attack on Washington, D.C., July 11–12.

The 150th Ohio Infantry mustered out of service August 23, 1864.

Ohio National Guard
Over 35,000 Ohio National Guardsmen were federalized and organized into regiments for 100 days service in May 1864. Shipped to the Eastern Theater, they were designed to be placed in "safe" rear areas to protect railroads and supply points, thereby freeing regular troops for Lt. Gen. Ulysses S. Grant’s push on the Confederate capital of Richmond, Virginia. As events transpired, many units found themselves in combat, stationed in the path of Confederate Gen. Jubal Early’s veteran Army of the Valley during its famed Valley Campaigns of 1864. Ohio Guard units met the battle-tested foe head on and helped blunt the Confederate offensive thereby saving Washington, D.C. from capture. Ohio National Guard units participated in the battles of Monacacy, Fort Stevens, Harpers Ferry, and in the siege of Petersburg.

Casualties
The regiment lost 12 enlisted men during service; 2 men killed and 10 men due to disease.

Commanders
 Colonel William H. Hayward

Notable members
 Private Robert Maynard Murray, Company D - U.S. Representative from Ohio, 1883-1885

See also

 List of Ohio Civil War units
 Ohio in the Civil War

References
 Cannon, James Calkins. Record of Service of Company K, 150th O.V.I., 1864 (S.l.:  s.n.), 1903. 
 Dyer, Frederick H. A Compendium of the War of the Rebellion (Des Moines, IA:  Dyer Pub. Co.), 1908.
 Gleason, William John. Historical Sketch of the 150th Regiment Ohio Volunteer Infantry:  Delivered at the 5th Annual Reunion, Scenic Park, Rocky River, July 12th, 1899 (S.l.:  s.n.), 1899.
 Ohio Roster Commission. Official Roster of the Soldiers of the State of Ohio in the War on the Rebellion, 1861–1865, Compiled Under the Direction of the Roster Commission (Akron, OH: Werner Co.), 1886–1895.
 Reid, Whitelaw. Ohio in the War: Her Statesmen, Her Generals, and Soldiers (Cincinnati, OH: Moore, Wilstach, & Baldwin), 1868. 
Attribution

External links
 Ohio in the Civil War: 150th Ohio Volunteer Infantry by Larry Stevens
 Battleground National Cemetery, Washington, D.C.

Military units and formations established in 1864
Military units and formations disestablished in 1864
1864 disestablishments in Ohio
Units and formations of the Union Army from Ohio
1864 establishments in Ohio